Bernardas is a Lithuanian masculine given name. Individuals with the name Bernardas include:
Bernardas Bučas (1903–1979) Lithuanian painter and sculptor
Bernardas Brazdžionis (1907–2002), Lithuanian poet
Bernardas Fridmanas (1859–1939), Lithuanian lawyer, judge, journalist, politician and Jewish activist
Bernardas Vasiliauskas (born 1938), Lithuanian pianist and organist

References

Lithuanian masculine given names